John E. McIntyre is the co-founder of RealClearPolitics. He also publishes on the TIME blog and has appeared on the nationally syndicated Michael Reagan Talk Show.

McIntyre, who majored in economics at Princeton University, was working as a trader at the Chicago Board Options Exchange in 2000 when he and co-founder Tom Bevan made the decision to launch RealClearPolitics. McIntrye said at the time, "We're political junkies and obsessive newspaper readers. So we decided that we would help people like us who don't have the time to cruise around the Web, but want to read the best articles of the day. We set up a one-stop shop where we do all the hunting, so others don't have to."

A 2017 SEC filing reported on by the Daily Beast listed RealClear co-founder John McIntyre as a director at FDRLST Media and put both companies at the same Chicago address. FDRLST Media is the parent company of conservative news site The Federalist.

References

External links 
RealClearPolitics

American bloggers
21st-century American non-fiction writers
Living people
Princeton University alumni
Year of birth missing (living people)